James Andrew Kelly (born September 15, 1936) is an American foreign policy advisor who served as Assistant Secretary of State for East Asian and Pacific Affairs from 2001 to 2005.

Education 
Raised in Atlanta, Georgia, Kelly attended Georgia Tech for one year before receiving an appointment to the United States Naval Academy. In 1959, he earned a Bachelor of Science from the Naval Academy. Kelly later earned an MBA from the Harvard Business School in 1968. He graduated from the National War College in 1977.

Career 
Kelly served in the United States Navy from 1959 to 1982, concluding his active duty as a Captain in the Navy Supply Corps. From June 1983 to March 1986, Kelly worked at the Pentagon as deputy assistant secretary of defense for international security affairs (East Asia and Pacific). Kelly served special assistant for national security affairs to President Ronald Reagan, and as senior director for Asian affairs on the United States National Security Council from March 1986 to March 1989. From 1989 to 1994, Kelly was president of EAP Associates, Inc., of Honolulu, which provided international business consulting services with an Asia and Pacific focus to private clients.

From 1994 to 2001, Kelly was president of Pacific Forum International, which has analyzed and led dialogue on Asia–Pacific political, security, and economic/business issues since 1975. He has served as a senior adviser and distinguished alumni at CSIS. In 2002, Kelly worked as an envoy to North Korea.

From 2001 to 2005, Kelly served as Assistant Secretary of State for East Asian and Pacific Affairs. President George W. Bush nominated Kelly on April 3, 2001. He was confirmed by the U.S. Senate on April 26, 2001 and sworn in on May 1, 2001.

Kelly currently serves as Chairman of the Board of the Directors of Pacific Forum International.

References

External links
CSIS biography

1936 births
Living people
Place of birth missing (living people)
People from Atlanta
Georgia Tech alumni
United States Naval Academy alumni
United States Navy officers
Harvard Business School alumni
National War College alumni
United States Department of Defense officials
Assistant Secretaries of State for East Asian and Pacific Affairs